Miss Barbados World beauty pageant selects representatives for the Miss World pageant from Barbados.

Organization
The current Miss Barbados World Pageant  franchise holder is Stephanie Chase. Before that the Franchise holder was Cortez Blacket, Stephanie Chase herself is a former Miss Barbados 2001 who won the talent portion at the Miss World contest in South Africa that year and later a five-year record contract. As of 2011, Stephanie Chase handed over the Miss Barbados World franchise to Leah Marville.

Notable finishes
To date, the only Miss Barbados winner who has  become a 'top ten finalist' in the Miss World pageant was Linda Yvonne Fields, who was placed eighth over-all in the 1974 Miss World Contest held at Royal Albert Hall, London, England. Since then, the only Miss Barbados who has been was predicted/projected to place at Miss World was the  2009 Miss Barbados title holder, Leah Marville.

In 2004 Kennifer Marius was placed 3rd in the Talent Competition behind Antigua and Barbuda, and China.

Stephanie Chase, Miss Barbados World 2001, won the first inaugural Miss World Talent Award. This led to Ms. Chase  receiving a five-year contract from AMI/ Sony CEO Eliot Cohen. She recorded in the United Kingdom. A UK tour also followed in 2003.

Titleholders

See also 
 Miss Universe Barbados
 Barbados at major beauty pageants

References

External links 
www.missbarbadosworld.com
Pageant Almanac for the list of titleholders

Barbados
Barbados
1974 establishments in Barbados
Barbadian awards